Ayanga (Traditional Mongolian:, born 23 October 1989) is a Mongolian musical theater actor, singer and songwriter from Inner Mongolia.

Early life 

Ayanga was born in Ordos City, Inner Mongolia Autonomous Region. His parents were sheep herders and died before he turned seven. He was raised by his older brother who was 20 years older. He received education in Mongolian and spoke little Mandarin when he was young. He was sent to the Ikezhao League Art School around age 12. He was selected into the Song and Dance Troupe of Inner Mongolian PLA at the age of 14. He did not remain complacent with his career path, so he travelled to Beijing to pursue his dream in art and performance at the age of 17. He was admitted into the prestigious Beijing Dance Academy and majored in Musical Theater. After graduating from college, he joined the Beijing Opera and Dance Theater and became a musical theater actor and a singer. In 2021, Ayanga was honored as a Distinguished Teacher by his alma mater Beijing Dance Academy.

Career 
In 2012, Ayanga starred in Chinese original musical Kunlun Myth with the theme of intangible cultural heritage Kunlun mythology, playing Sauran and Pangu. The same year, he starred in the original Chinese musical Tianqiao directed by Tian Qinxin, playing Lin Pengfei. Recommended by Tian Qinxin, Ayanga joined the Beijing Song and Dance Theater as a solo actor after graduating from Beijing Dance Academy.

In 2013, Ayanga participated in the Chinese musical Nasirdin Afandi. The same year, he participated in The Third Inner Mongolia Young Singer TV Competition and won the first prize for mainstream singing. In 2014, he won the third prize of the "Wenhua Award" popular group in the national vocal competition. In 2014, Ayanga participated in the Anhui TV's reality show Mr. Super which he won the championship; and the CCTV-3 music reality show Rising Star China which he emerged as runner-up.

In June 2015, Ayanga released his first solo single "Thank You". On 31 December of the same year, Ayanga held a concert with the title "The Return of The Thunder God" in Ordos City, which was his first solo concert since his debut. He also participated in the musical The Legend and the dance drama History in the Song.

In February 2016, Ayanga participated in the CCTV New Year's Gala for the first time with Jiang Xin, Wu Yingwei and others. The same year, he co-starred in the web drama Weapon & Soul. In December, he held a concert with Zhaxi Dunzhu titled "Two Heroes Battle" which was broadcast on CCTV. He also released his first solo album Shartal Grassland.

In 2017, Ayanga starred in the Chinese musical A Moment of Remembrance; as well as the musical My Bucket List. His second solo concert Sing Your Heart Out was broadcast on CCTV-15. The same year, he also participated in several important occasions, including the closing ceremony of the 13th National Games; the closing ceremony of the 26th China Golden Rooster and Hundred Flowers Film Festival and the Sino-Russian Artists Gala.

In February 2018, Ayanga's third concert Peak Musical Concert was broadcast on CCTV-15. The same year he played Namuhai in the television series The Story of My Parents' Youth directed by Kang Honglei. Ayanga then participated in Hunan Television's music reality show Super–Vocal and emerged as one of the six final winners. Together with Zheng Yunlong, Frank Ju and Cai Chengyu (collectively known as the Super-Vocal Boys group), he participated in Hunan Television's singing contest show Singer 2019 and emerged as the 2nd runner up of the season.

On 4 February 2019, he participated in the CCTV New Year's Gala and sang the song "Building a Chinese Dream Together". The same year, he starred in the play The Merchant of Venice playing Antonio. Forbes China listed Ayanga under their 30 Under 30 Asia 2019 list which consisted of 30 influential people under 30 years old who have had a substantial effect in their fields. From 2019 to 2020, he joined Dragon TV's singing variety program Our Song.

In 2020, Ayanga appeared in CCTV New Year's Gala, performing the song "Dear China" alongside  Jiang Dawei and several other veteran artists. On 23 July, Ayanga released his first musical album titled The Art. On 13 November, he announced that he will play the lead role, Yao Yuan, in the original musical On the Road, which tells the story of China's vast number of delivery men, the backbone of the express mail industry. 

In February 2021, Ayanga participated in the CCTV New Year's Gala and sang the song "瑞雪平安图" together with Cecilia Han, Tia Ray and Karry Wang. He then performed the song "Centennial" with Liao Changyong and Cai Chengyu in the CCTV Lantern Festival Gala. The same year, he also participated in several important occasions, including the CCTV National Day Gala and 2022 Beijing Winter Olympics 100 days countdown. 
 In November, he announced that he will star as Romeo in the Chinese version of the French musical Romeo and Juliet.

On 26 January 2022, Ayanga was appointed the head of the first state-owned musical theatre troupe in China. In February, he participated in the CCTV New Year's Gala and performed the item "Memories of Southern China" together with Aska Yang and various artists. He then joined the musical variety program The City of Musicals as one of the mentors. In July, he joined the variety E-Pop of China. He starred in the In Search of Lost Time (film) as one of the main leads and also participated in the Bilibili produced voice actor show Voice Monsters as the stage director. In November, he announced his second EP Four Dreams in Linchuan  which makes reference to a collection of four major dramas by the famed Ming-dynasty dramatist Tang Xianzu. He produced and starred in the Chinese version of the musical The Count of Monte Cristo, which commenced in December. On 30 December, he announced he will act as the Phantom in the Chinese version of the musical The Phantom of the Opera which will begin touring mid 2023.

Theatre

Discography

Studio Albums 

 Shartal Grassland 希拉草原 (2016) 

 Immortal·THE ART  不朽的·THE ART (2020)

*Disc 2 has been released in October 2020

EPs
Ni Guang Er Xing 逆光而行四部曲 (2019)

Four Dreams in Linchuan 临川四梦 (2022)

Singles

Filmography

Film

Television Series

Variety Shows and Documentary

Concerts
The Return of The Thunder God 雷神归来 (2015)
Sing Your Heart Out 纵情歌唱 (2017) 
Peak Musical Concert 巅峰音乐会 (2018)

Ambassador activities

Awards

References

External links 

 

1989 births
Living people
Chinese male television actors
Chinese male stage actors
21st-century Chinese male singers
Beijing Dance Academy alumni
Singers from Inner Mongolia
Male actors from Inner Mongolia
Chinese male musical theatre actors